Dimitar Kotev (3 March 1941 – 8 November 2001) was a Bulgarian cyclist. He competed at the 1960 Summer Olympics in the individual road race and in the 100 km team time trial and finished in 17th place in the latter event. He had second-third places at some stages of the Peace Race in 1956, 1962 and 1969.

References 

1941 births
2001 deaths
Olympic cyclists of Bulgaria
Cyclists at the 1960 Summer Olympics
Bulgarian male cyclists
Presidential Cycling Tour of Turkey winners
Sportspeople from Sofia